Noise Floor is the thirteenth studio album by American progressive rock band Spock's Beard. It is the band's first full album of original material to feature original drummer Nick D'Virgilio since X in 2010, although this time D'Virgilio is only as a session musician.  D'Virgilio had previously recorded a new song with the band for the compilation album The First Twenty Years and a bonus track for the band's previous album The Oblivion Particle, both released in 2015. Noise Floor was released on 25 May 2018.

Background and recording
In October 2016, drummer Jimmy Keegan announced that he had left Spock's Beard in order to pursue other interests and the band's original drummer, Nick D'Virgilio, was drafted in to fulfill concert commitments. In March 2017, the band confirmed that they had begun writing for their next album, with plans to begin recording in May with D'Virgilio as studio drummer.

As with their previous three albums, recording and mixing for the then untitled thirteenth album was conducted at The Mouse House in Altadena, California, with additional drum tracking at Sweetwater in Fort Wayne, Indiana. Mixing was completed by Rich Mouser in February 2018.

In March 2018, the album title and release date were revealed. It was also announced that the album would be released with a bonus EP of material from the same recording sessions, titled Cutting Room Floor. It was released on 25 May 2018.

Reception

The album received generally favourable reviews.  In his review for Sonic Perspectives, Scott Medina praised Rich Mouser's production and the band members' musicianship, stating that "none of the material here may reach the Top 10 Spock's songs of all time, but they all hover within a good to excellent range". Reviews for Keyboard magazine and The Prog Report both singled out Ryo Okumoto's contribution as particularly noteworthy.

Track listing

Personnel
Spock's Beard
 Ted Leonard – lead vocals
 Alan Morse – electric and acoustic guitars, backing vocals
 Ryo Okumoto – keyboards
 Dave Meros – bass guitar, backing vocals

Additional musicians
 Nick D'Virgilio – drums and percussion, backing vocals
 Eric Gorfain – violin
 Leah Katz – viola
 Richard Dodd – cello
 David Robertson – English horn

Production
 Rich Mouser – mastering, mixing

Charts

References

2018 albums
Spock's Beard albums
Inside Out Music albums